Coleophora laconiae is a moth of the family Coleophoridae. It is found in Greece.

References

laconiae
Moths of Europe